The Chronicles of the Eastern Zhou Kingdoms is a Chinese historical novel written by Feng Menglong in the late Ming dynasty. Set in the Eastern Zhou dynasty, the novel starts from the Chinese kingdom beginning to break apart into smaller states and ends with the first unification of the land accomplished by Qin Shi Huang.

It is one of the best-known historical novels regarding ancient China.  The novel is based on classical texts such as the Zuo Tradition and the Records of the Grand Historian and some of the sacred classic books of China such as the Book of Rites and the Classic of Poetry.

Translations
The novel has been translated into several languages, including Korean, Thai and Vietnamese. The Korean version was done in 2003. The Thai version was done in 1819 by a committee of senior public officers at the behest of King Rama II. The Vietnamese version was done in 1933 by Nguyễn Đỗ Mục.

Erik Honobe has translated the first ten chapters into English (The Rise of Lord Zhuang of Zheng, ISBN 978-962-7255-48-2). Some chapters can be viewed on the website of Renditions: Chapter 1 and Chapter 5.
,

Olivia Milburn has translated 17 out of the original 108 chapters into English (Kingdoms in Peril: A Novel of the Ancient Chinese World at War, ISBN 9780520380516).

References 

Ming dynasty novels
17th-century Chinese novels
Works by Feng Menglong
Novels set in the Zhou dynasty
Chinese historical novels
Novels set in Henan
Novels set in Shandong
Novels set in Hebei
Novels set in Shanxi
Novels set in Hubei
Novels set in Shaanxi
Novels set in Jiangsu
Novels set in Zhejiang
Novels set in the 8th century BC
Novels set in the 7th century BC
Novels set in the 6th century BC
Novels set in the 5th century BC
Novels set in the 4th century BC
Novels set in the 3rd century BC